"Goodnight, Irene" or "Irene, Goodnight," is a 20th-century American folk standard, written in  time, first recorded by American blues musician Huddie 'Lead Belly' Ledbetter in 1933. A version recorded by the Weavers was a #1 hit in 1950.

The lyrics tell of the singer's troubled past with his love, Irene, and express his sadness and frustration. Several verses refer explicitly to suicidal fantasies, most famously in the line "sometimes I take a great notion to jump in the river and drown," which was the inspiration for the title of the 1964 Ken Kesey novel Sometimes a Great Notion and a song of the same name from John Mellencamp's 1989 album, Big Daddy, itself strongly informed by traditional American folk music.

Origin
In 1886, Gussie Lord Davis published a song called "Irene, Goodnight".  The lyrics of the song have some similarities to "Goodnight, Irene" to suggest that Huddie Ledbetter's song was based on Davis' lyrics. There is also a degree of resemblance in the music despite some differences, such as their time signatures, to indicate that the two songs are related. According to Ledbetter, he first heard the core of the song, the refrain, and a couple of verses from his Uncle Terrill. Another uncle of Ledbetter, Bob Ledbetter, who also recorded a nearly identical version of the song, said that he also learned the song from Terrill. Family members of Huddie Ledbetter indicate that he may have sung the song as early as 1908 as a lulluby to his niece, Irene Campbell. Ledbetter eventually extended the song to six verses.

Lead Belly's version 
John Lomax recorded a version of Huddie Ledbetter's song "Irene" in 1933, on a prison visit to Angola (Louisiana State Penitentiary). These recordings for the Library of Congress included three takes of "Irene". The first version recorded in 1933 had two verses and two choruses, the second version from 1934 had four verses and four refrains, while the third version from 1936 had six verses and six refrains, including an extended spoken part.

As part of the Federal Art Project that began in 1935, the song was published in 1936, in Lomax's version, as "Goodnight, Irene", a joint Ledbetter-Lomax composition. It has a straightforward verse–chorus form, but is in waltz time. It is a three-chord song, characterised as a "folk ballad" with a three-phrase melody, with provenance in 19th-century popular music transmitted by oral tradition.

"Irene" has been styled by Neil V. Rosenberg a "folk recomposition" of the 1886 song "Irene Good Night" by Gussie L. Davis. Hank Williams connected the melody to the English ballad tradition, via a mountain song he knew as "Pere Ellen". Lead Belly's account was of performing "Irene" by 1908, in a way he learned from his uncles Ter(r)ell and Bob. By the 1930s, he had made the song his own, modifying the rhythm and rewriting most of the verses. John and Alan Lomax made a field recording of Bob Ledbetter's version of the song.

Lead Belly continued performing the song during his prison terms. An extended version of the song that includes narratives connecting the verses appears in Negro Folk Songs as Sung by Lead Belly. In 1941, Woody Guthrie used the melody for his New Deal anthem Roll On, Columbia, Roll On.

"Irene" remained a staple of Lead Belly's performances throughout the 1930s and 1940s. In 2002, Lead Belly's Library of Congress recording received a Grammy Hall of Fame Award.

Version by the Weavers 
In 1950, one year after Lead Belly's death, the American folk band the Weavers recorded a version of "Goodnight, Irene". It was a B-side track on the Decca label, produced by Milt Gabler. The arranger was Gordon Jenkins. It was a national hit, as was the A-side, a version of Tzena, Tzena, Tzena; sales were recorded as 2 million copies.

The single first reached the Billboard Best Sellers in Stores chart on June 30, 1950 and lasted 25 weeks on the chart, peaking at #1 for 13 weeks. Although generally faithful, the Weavers chose to omit some of Lead Belly's lyrics, leading Time magazine to label it a "dehydrated" and "prettied up" version of the original. The Weavers' lyrics are the ones now generally used. and Billboard ranked this version as the No. 1 song of 1950.

Covers
After the Weavers' success, many other artists released versions of the song, some of which were commercially successful in several genres. Frank Sinatra's cover, released a month after the Weavers', lasted nine weeks on the Billboard magazine Best Seller chart on July 10, peaking at #5. Later that same year, Ernest Tubb and Red Foley had a number 1 country music record with the song, and the Alexander Brothers, Dennis Day and Jo Stafford released versions which made the Best Seller chart, peaking at number 26, number 17 and number 9 respectively. Moon Mullican had a number 5 country hit with it in 1950, and a version by Paul Gayten and his Orchestra reached number 6 on the Billboard R&B chart in the same year.

On the Cash Box chart, where all available versions were combined in the standings, the song reached a peak position of number 1 on September 2, 1950, and lasted at number 1 for 13 weeks.

The song was the basis for the 1950 parody called "Please Say Goodnight to the Guy, Irene" by Ziggy Talent. It also inspired the 1954 "answer" record "Wake Up, Irene" by Hank Thompson, a No. 1 on Billboards country chart.

Other hit versions
 1959: Billy Williams reached number 75 on the US Billboard pop chart.
 1962: Jerry Reed reached number 79 on the US pop chart.

Use in football 
"Goodnight Irene" is sung by supporters of English football team Bristol Rovers. It was first sung at a fireworks display at the Stadium the night before a Home game against Plymouth Argyle in 1950. During the game, the following day, Rovers were winning quite comfortably and the few Argyle supporters present began to leave early prompting a chorus of "Goodnight Argyle" from the Rovers supporters—the tune stuck and "Goodnight Irene" became the club song. The song was sung by Plymouth Argyle supporters for a long time before this and this added to the goading by the Bristol Rovers fans.

Other uses 
In professional wrestling, "Adorable" Adrian Adonis frequently referred to his finishing move—a standard sleeperhold—as "Goodnight, Irene."

See also
 "If It Had Not Been For Jesus", a Christian gospel sung to the same tune, first recorded in 1930 by Blind Willie Johnson

References
Oliver, Paul (1984). Songsters and saints: vocal traditions on race records. Cambridge Univ. Press, Cambridge. .

External links
Youtube Leon Russell Goodnight Irene in Studio (video has been removed)

External links
"Good Night Irene" - lyrics and midi on RienziHills.com Retrieved on 2009-08-10.
Recording of "Good Night Irene" in .ram (Real Audio Metadata) format on LeadBelly.org (The first verse of Good Night Irene is also played on the Intro page of LeadBelly.org without requiring the Real Audio download.) Retrieved on January 7, 2012.

1950 singles
Lead Belly songs
Songs written by Lead Belly
The Weavers songs
Frank Sinatra songs
Ernest Tubb songs
Red Foley songs
Jo Stafford songs
Moon Mullican songs
Number-one singles in the United States
Grammy Hall of Fame Award recipients
American folk songs
Pop standards
1908 songs
Football songs and chants
United States National Recording Registry recordings